Defend Music is an independent music publishing company and music rights administrator based in Los Angeles. The firm is best known for publishing the songs of soul music group Sharon Jones & The Dap-Kings and other writers and artists on Daptone Records, and publishes shares of hits by Jay-Z, Black Eyed Peas, Kaskade and others. German expatriate Michael Prommer started the company in 2004.

In its early years, Defend also offered music distribution services and had a record label that released music by Simian Mobile Disco, 9th Wonder and others.

Outside of North America, Defend's songs are sub-published by Kobalt.

References

Music publishing companies of the United States